The coronal suture is a dense, fibrous connective tissue joint that separates the two parietal bones from the frontal bone of the skull.

Structure 
The coronal suture lies between the paired parietal bones and the frontal bone of the skull. It runs from the pterion on each side.

Nerve supply 
The coronal suture is likely supplied by a branch of the trigeminal nerve.

Development 
The coronal suture is derived from the paraxial mesoderm.

Clinical significance 
If certain bones of the skull grow too fast then premature fusion of the sutures may occur.  This can result in skull deformities.  There are two possible deformities that can be caused by the premature closure of the coronal suture: 
 a high, tower-like skull called "oxycephaly" or "turret skull".
 a twisted and asymmetrical skull called "plagiocephaly".

References 

 "Sagittal suture." Stedman's Medical Dictionary, 27th ed. (2000).
 Moore, Keith L., and T.V.N. Persaud. The Developing Human: Clinically Oriented Embryology, 7th ed. (2003).

Additional images

External links 

 
 

Cranial sutures
Human head and neck
Joints
Joints of the head and neck
Skeletal system
Skull